Roman Baranov (born June 25, 1973) is a Soviet and Russian former professional ice hockey forward. He is a one-time Russian Champion.

Awards and honors

References

External links
Biographical information and career statistics from Eliteprospects.com, or The Internet Hockey Database

1973 births
Living people
Ak Bars Kazan players
Neftyanik Almetyevsk players
HC Neftekhimik Nizhnekamsk players
Ariada Volzhsk players
Russian ice hockey forwards